The 2005 Malaysian motorcycle Grand Prix was the thirteenth round of the 2005 Grand Prix motorcycle racing season. It took place on the weekend of 23–25 September 2005 at the Sepang International Circuit.

MotoGP classification

250 cc classification

125 cc classification

Championship standings after the race (motoGP)

Below are the standings for the top five riders and constructors after round thirteen has concluded.

Riders' Championship standings

Constructors' Championship standings

 Note: Only the top five positions are included for both sets of standings.

References

External links
 List of past winners

Malaysian motorcycle Grand Prix
Malaysia
Motorcycle Grand Prix